Tamkin Khalilzade (born on 6 August 1993) is an Azerbaijani professional footballer who plays as a defender.

Club career
Khalilzade was born in Baku, Azerbaijan.

On 30 December 2017, Khalilzade signed a 2.5-year contract with Gabala FK.

A year later, on 29 December 2018, Khalilzade signed 2.5-year contract with Sabah FK.

On 25 May 2021, Zira announced the signing of Khalilzade. On 29 December 2022, Zira announced the departure of Khalilzade by mutual agreement.

International career
Khalilzade made his Azerbaijan debut in 2017 against San Marino in 2018 FIFA World Cup qualification.

Career statistics

Club

International

International goals
Scores and results list Azerbaijan's goal tally first.

Honours

Club
Qarabağ
 Azerbaijan Premier League: (1) 2013–14,

References

External links
 

1993 births
Living people
Footballers from Baku
Association football defenders
Azerbaijani footballers
Azerbaijan international footballers
Azerbaijan Premier League players
Qarabağ FK players
AZAL PFK players
Zira FK players
Gabala FC players
Sabah FC (Azerbaijan) players